Seyid Yahya Bakuvi – was a 15th-century Azerbaijani scientist and philosopher.

Life

Seyid Yahya Bakuvi was born in Shamakhi into a rich family in 1403. Seyid Yahya Bakuvi lived in the 15th century, in Baku in the palace of Khalilullah I. In his youth he was engaged in Sufism, and was a follower of the eminent Sheikh Sadr ad-Din al Khalvati, leader of the tariqa’s Shirvan. After the sheikh’s death, Seyid Yahya quarreled with a student Pirizade about who would lead Khalvati’s sect; he then left Shamakhi to move to Baku. In Baku he settled in the palace of Khalilullah I, where he enjoyed wide popularity as a philosopher and scientist. Soon the number of his followers (in countries of the Near East, too) exceeded ten thousand people.

Death

According to one source, the date of Bakuvi’s death was 862 AH (1457), to another it was 868 AH (1463). There is a Mausoleum of Seyid Yahya Bakuvi in the Shirvanshahs’ Palace complex. The date on that building is the date of mausoleum's construction.

Bakuvi’s works
15 works of Seyid Yahya Bakuvi have been saved up to date. His works have a sufistic and mystic character. They are kept in cities of Turkey: Istanbul (“Muradiye” library), Konya, Manisa. Seyid Yahya wrote such philosophic treatises as “Sharkh-I Gulshani-raz”(“Comments to flower garden of secrets”), “Asrar at-Talibin” (“Secrets of searchers of the truth”), “Symbolism of signs”, “Comments to the Safavids dynasty”, “Secrets of spirits” and others, penetrated through religious and mystic ideas which are valuable sources in the sphere of investigation of philosophy, astronomy and math.

References

Arts in Azerbaijan
People from Shamakhi
Azerbaijani Muslims
1410 births
1462 deaths
Azerbaijani philosophers
15th-century philosophers
Sufi poets
Khalwati order
Azerbaijani-language poets
15th-century poets